Hokkaidō 5th district is a constituency of the House of Representatives in the Diet of Japan. It consists of Atsubetsu ward in Hokkaido's city of Sapporo and Ishikari Subprefecture without Sapporo. As of 2009, 453,752 eligible voters were registered in the district.

The district was created in the 1994 electoral reform from parts of the previous 1st district where six representatives had been elected by single-non-transferable vote. Representatives from the old 1st district included Kingo Machimura and his son Nobutaka Machimura.

Nobutaka Machimura (LDP, Machimura faction) safely won the new 5th district in the 1996 election and defended it against Democratic challenger Chiyomi Kobayashi in subsequent elections. The 2009 general election, though, gave the Democratic Party a landslide victory and Kobayashi surpassed Machimura by 30,000 votes. She resigned in June 2010 over a political funds scandal. Machimura resigned from his seat in the Hokkaidō proportional block to run in the resulting by-election in October 2010 and defeated former construction ministry bureaucrat Shigeyuki Nakamae by a clear margin to regain his district seat.

In the 24 April 2016 by-election, Machimura's son-in-law, Liberal Democrat Yoshiaki Wada (Kōmeitō, Kokoro, Daichi) defeated united opposition independent Maki Ikeda (DP, JCP, SDP, PLP).

List of representatives

Election results

References 

Politics of Hokkaido
Districts of the House of Representatives (Japan)